Communist Party of Aragon (in Spanish: Partido Comunista de Aragón, in Aragonese: Partiu Comunista d'Aragón), is the federation of the Communist Party of Spain (PCE) in Aragon.

References

External links
PCA website

Aragon
Political parties in Aragon
Political parties with year of establishment missing